Roque Ramírez (born 16 August 1999) is an Argentine professional footballer who plays as a left-back for Uruguayan side River Plate, on loan from Atlético de Rafaela.

Career
Ramírez began his career with Atlético de Rafaela. Juan Manuel Llop picked the midfielder for his professional bow on 1 February 2019, he played the full duration of a loss to Villa Dálmine in Primera B Nacional.

Career statistics
.

References

External links

1999 births
Living people
Argentine footballers
Argentine expatriate footballers
Place of birth missing (living people)
Association football midfielders
Primera Nacional players
Uruguayan Primera División players
Atlético de Rafaela footballers
Club Atlético River Plate (Montevideo) players
Argentine expatriate sportspeople in Uruguay
Expatriate footballers in Uruguay